City Limits is a 1934 American Pre-Code romantic comedy film directed by William Nigh and starring Frank Craven, Sally Blane, Ray Walker and Claude Gillingwater. It was remade in 1941 as Father Steps Out.

Plot
In a variation of Captains Courageous, J.B. Matthews (Frank Craven) president of a railroad, is getting sick of doctors, when he falls off his train, and meets up with a pair of hoboes, King (James Burke) and Napoleon (Jimmy Conlin), who show him how to enjoy life, and real cooking. It's up to intrepid reporter Jimmy Dugan (Ray Walker) and Helen (Sally Blane) to find him, and bring him in. The hope is that they do it before a rival ruins him. However, time is running out.

Cast

Frank Craven as J.B. Matthews
Sally Blane as Helen Matthews
Ray Walker as Jimmy Dugan
Claude Gillingwater as Oliver
James Burke as King
Jimmy Conlin as Nap
Jane Keckley as Aunt Martha
Henry Roquemore as Macy
Harry C. Bradley as Dr. Stafford
George "Gabby" Hayes as Carter
George Cleveland as Graflex
George Nash as Jones
Fern Emmett as Mrs. Benton

References

External links 

1934 films
American romantic comedy films
1934 romantic comedy films
American black-and-white films
Films based on American novels
Films directed by William Nigh
Monogram Pictures films
1930s English-language films
1930s American films